Ballymore GAA is a Gaelic Athletic Association club located in the town of Ballymore  in County Westmeath, Ireland.

History
The team enjoyed some success at Intermediate level by winning 4 times, and were Senior Championship finalists in 1965.

External links
 https://web.archive.org/web/20110723022800/http://ballymoregaa.net/index.php

Gaelic games clubs in County Westmeath
1884 establishments in Ireland